Edwin Cassiani Tejedor (born October 28, 1972, in San Basilio de Palenque, Mahates) is a retired male boxer from Colombia, who competed in the light-welterweight division (– 63.5 kg) during his career. He represented his native country at the 1992 Summer Olympics in Barcelona, Spain, where he was defeated in the first round of the men's light-welterweight competition by Cuba's eventual gold medalist Héctor Vinent (4:27).

References
Profile

1972 births
Living people
Light-welterweight boxers
Olympic boxers of Colombia
Boxers at the 1992 Summer Olympics
People from Casanare Department
Colombian male boxers